Steffen Rasmussen (born 15 April 1991) is a Danish badminton player. In 2009, he won the boys' singles and doubles bronze medals at the European Junior Championships. In 2015, he won the men's singles title at the Finnish International tournament.

Achievements

European Junior Championships 
Boys' singles

Boys' doubles

BWF International Challenge/Series 
Men's singles

  BWF International Challenge tournament
  BWF International Series tournament

References

External links 
 

1991 births
Living people
Danish male badminton players